This is a list of armies arranged by ordinal number.

First Army
First Allied Airborne Army
First Army (Australia)
First Army (Austria-Hungary)
First Army (Bulgaria)
First Canadian Army
New 1st Army (Republic of China)
First Army (France)
1st Army (German Empire), a World War I field army
1st Army (Wehrmacht), a World War II field army
1st Panzer Army (Germany)
1st Parachute Army (Germany)
First Army (Greece)
First Army (Hungary)
First Army (Italy)
First Army (Japan)
First Army (Ottoman Empire)
First Polish Army (1920)
First Polish Army (1944–45)
First Army (Romania)
1st Army (Russian Empire)
First Army (Serbia)
1st Red Banner Army (Soviet Union)
First Army (Turkey)
First Army (United Kingdom)
First United States Army
1st Army (Kingdom of Yugoslavia)

Second Army
Second Army (Australia)
Second Army (Austria-Hungary)
Second Army (Bulgaria)
Second Army (Egypt)
Second Army (France)
2nd Army (German Empire), a World War I field army
2nd Army (Wehrmacht), a World War II field army
2nd Panzer Army (Germany)
Second Army (Hungary)
Second Army (Italy)
Second Army (Japan)
Second Army (Ottoman Empire)
Second Army (Poland)
2nd Army (Russian Empire)
Second Army (Serbia)
2nd Red Banner Army (Soviet Union)
Second Army (Turkey)
Second United States Army
Second Army (United Kingdom)
2nd Army (Kingdom of Yugoslavia)

Third Army
Third Army (Bulgaria)
Third Army (Egypt)
Third Army (France)
3rd Army (German Empire), a World War I field army
3rd Army (Wehrmacht), a World War II field army
3rd Panzer Army (Germany)
Third Army (Ottoman Empire)
Third Army (Italy)
Third Army (Romania)
Third Army (Serbia)
3rd Army (Russian Empire)
3rd Army (Soviet Union)
Third Army (Turkey)
Third Army (United Kingdom)
Third United States Army, another name for United States Army Central
3rd Army (Kingdom of Yugoslavia)

Fourth Army
Fourth Army (Bulgaria)
Fourth Army (National Revolutionary Army) (Republic of China)
New Fourth Army (Republic of China)
Fourth Army (France)
4th Army (German Empire), a World War I field army
4th Army (Wehrmacht), a World War II field army
4th Panzer Army (Germany)
Fourth Army (Ottoman Empire)
Fourth Army (Italy)
Fourth Army (Romania)
4th Army (Russian Empire)
4th Army (Soviet Union)
4th Air Army (Soviet Union and later Russian Federation)
4th Guards Army (Soviet Union)
20th Guards Army (originally designated as "Fourth Tank Army") (Soviet Union)
Fourth Army (United Kingdom)
Fourth United States Army
4th Army (Kingdom of Yugoslavia)

Fifth Army
Fifth Army (Austria-Hungary)
Fifth Army (Bulgaria)
Fifth Army (France)
5th Army (German Empire), a World War I field army
5th Army (Wehrmacht), a World War II field army
5th Panzer Army (Germany)
Fifth Army (Japan)
Fifth Army (Ottoman Empire)
Fifth Army (Italy)
5th Army (Russian Empire)
5th Army (Soviet Union)
Fifth Army (United Kingdom)
Fifth United States Army, another name for United States Army North
5th Army (Kingdom of Yugoslavia)

Sixth Army
Sixth Army (Austria-Hungary)
Sixth Army (France)
6th Army (German Empire), a World War I field army
6th Army (Wehrmacht), a World War II field army
6th Panzer Army (Germany)
Sixth Army (Japan)
Sixth Army (Ottoman Empire)
Sixth Army (Italy)
6th Army (Russian Empire)
6th Army (Soviet Union)
Sixth United States Army
6th Army (Kingdom of Yugoslavia)

Seventh Army
Seventh Army (France)
7th Army (German Empire), a World War I field army
7th Army (Wehrmacht), a World War II field army
Seventh Army (Ottoman Empire)
Seventh Army (Italy)
7th Army (Russian Empire)
7th Army (Soviet Union)
Seventh United States Army, another name for United States Army Europe
7th Army (Kingdom of Yugoslavia)

Eighth Army

Eighth Route Army, a Chinese Communist force that fought against the Japanese during World War II
Eighth Army (France)
8th Army (German Empire), a World War I field army
8th Army (Wehrmacht), a World War II field army
Japanese Eighth Area Army
Ottoman Eighth Army
Eighth Army (Italy), during World War II another name for the Italian Army in Russia 
Eighth Army (United Kingdom)
Eighth United States Army
8th Army (Russian Empire)
8th Army (Soviet Union)
8th Guards Army (Russia)

Ninth Army
Ninth Army (France), a field army during World War I and World War II
9th Army (German Empire), a World War I field army
9th Army (Wehrmacht), a World War II field army
Ninth Army (Ottoman Empire), a World War I field army
Ninth Army (Italy) 
9th Army (Russian Empire), a World War I field army
9th Army (Soviet Union), a field army active from 1939–43 and then after the war from 1966-1989
Ninth Army (United Kingdom), a British Army formation during World War II
Ninth United States Army, used in Northwest Europe in 1944 and 1945

Tenth Army
Tenth Army (France)
10th Army (German Empire), a World War I field army
10th Army (Wehrmacht), a World War II field army
Tenth Army (Japan)
Tenth Army (Italy)
10th Army (Russian Empire)
10th Army (Soviet Union)
Tenth Army (United Kingdom)
10th Guards Army (Soviet Union)
Tenth United States Army

Eleventh Army
11th Army (German Empire), a World War I field army
11th Army (Wehrmacht), a World War II field army
11th SS Panzer Army
Eleventh Army (Japan)
Eleventh Army (Italy)
11th Air Army (Russia)
11th Army (Russian Empire)
11th Army (Soviet Union)
11th Army Group (United Kingdom)

Twelfth Army
12th Army (German Empire), a World War I field army
12th Army (Wehrmacht), a World War II field army
Twelfth Army (Japan)
12th Army (Russian Empire)
12th Army (Soviet Union)
Twelfth Army (United Kingdom)
Twelfth Army (Italy)

Thirteenth Army
Thirteenth Army (Japan)
Japanese Thirteenth Area Army
13th Army (Russian Empire)

Fourteenth Army
14th Army (German Empire), a World War I field army
14th Army (Wehrmacht), a World War II field army
Japanese Fourteenth Area Army
14th Army (Soviet Union)
14th Guards Army (Soviet Union)
Fourteenth Army (United Kingdom)
Fourteenth United States Army, a World War II 'phantom' force

Fifteenth Army
15th Army (Wehrmacht), a formation of the German Army during World War II
Fifteenth Army (Japan), a formation of the Imperial Japanese Army during World War II
Japanese Fifteenth Area Army, a formation of the Imperial Japanese Army during World War II
15th Army Group, a combined formation of the United Kingdom and United States armies during World War II
Fifteenth United States Army, a formation of the United States Army during World War II

Sixteenth Army
16th Army (Wehrmacht), a unit of the German Army in World War II
11th Guards Army (16th Army, Soviet Union), a unit of the Soviet Army from World War II through the Cold War
Western Army (Russia) (16th Soviet Army), a unit of the Soviet Army during World War I
16th Army (People's Republic of China), a unit of People's Republic of China which still active right now.

Seventeenth Army
 17th Army (German Empire), a World War I field Army
 17th Army (Wehrmacht), a World War II field army
 Seventeenth Army (Japan)
 Japanese Seventeenth Area Army during World War II (see List of Armies of the Japanese Army)
 17th Army (Soviet Union)

Eighteenth Army
 18th Army (German Empire), a World War I field Army
 18th Army (Wehrmacht), a World War II field army
18th Army (Soviet Union)
Eighteenth Army (Japan)

Nineteenth Army
 19th Army (German Empire), a World War I field Army
 19th Army (Wehrmacht), a World War II field army
 Nineteenth Army (Japan)
 19th Army (Soviet Union)

Twentieth Army
Twentieth Army (Japan)
20th Group Army - People's Liberation Army
20th Guards Army - Soviet Union and Russia
20th Army (Soviet Union)
20th Mountain Army (Wehrmacht)

Twenty first Army
21st Army (Wehrmacht)

See also
List of armies
List of countries by number of military and paramilitary personnel

Numbered armies